Stomatella esperanzae is a species of sea snail, a marine gastropod mollusk in the family Trochidae, the top snails.

Distribution
This species occurs in the Pacific Ocean off Easter Island.

References

External links
 To USNM Invertebrate Zoology Mollusca Collection
 To World Register of Marine Species

esperanzae
Gastropods described in 1980